The World Is My Enemy Now is the third studio album by American metalcore band Upon a Burning Body. The album was released on August 12, 2014 through Sumerian Records. The album was produced by Will Putney, who produced their two albums, The World Is Ours and Red. White. Green.

Controversy
In July 2014 the band received negative attention for a publicity stunt to promote this album, where the band reported that frontman Danny Leal was missing. The band later posted the album cover for the album which was still unreleased, which showed Leal tied up in the background, thus revealing the whole angle to be a joke. Since then, the band refused to apologize.

Track listing

Personnel
Upon a Burning Body
 Danny Leal - vocals
 Sal Dominguez - lead guitar
 Ruben Alvarez - rhythm guitar
 Rey Martinez - bass
 Ramon "The Lord Cocos" Villarreal - drums

Additional musicians
 Matt Heafy (Trivium) – guest vocals on "Blood, Sweat and Tears"
 Tyler Smith (The Word Alive) – guest vocals on "I've Earned My Time"

Production
 Will Putney – production, engineering, mixing, mastering
 Randy Leboeuf, Tom Smith Jr., Alberto De Icaza – additional editing and engineering
 Ash Avildsen – vocal production and additional lyrics on "Scars", "Fountain of Wishes", "Bring the Rain" and "Judgement", additional vocal production
 Shawn Keith – additional vocal production, A&R
 Lorenzo Antonucci – additional vocal engineering at Sumerian Studios, Los Angeles, CA
 Danny Leal - lyrics
 Ruben Alvarez - lyrics

Management
 Outerloop Management – management
 JJ Cassiere (Circle Talent North America) and Jim Moorewood (Eccentric Gent Organization Ltd.) – booking agents

Artwork
 Daniel McBride (McBride Design) – album layout and design, art direction/concept
 Nick Walters – additional vocal production, A&R, art direction/concept
 Josh Huskin – photography

References

2014 albums
Upon a Burning Body albums
Sumerian Records albums
Albums produced by Will Putney